Sanpolino is a station of the Brescia Metro, in the city of Brescia in northern Italy. The station is located in the centre of Sanpolino, a densely populated modern and innovative suburb of Brescia.

The site of the station has affected the entire surrounding area by the construction of large concrete pillars to support the elevated  metro line, and requiring reorganization of the road network. Under the overhead structure of the tracks and the station there are two long rows of car parking, totaling approximately 1,400 spaces, intended to attract passengers from the nearby communities of Sant'Eufemia della Fonte and Buffalora.

Connecting buses
 9 - Violino - Badia - Milano - Centro - Foro Boario - S.Polo Case - Sanpolino - Buffalora
 16 - Onzato - Roncadelle - Violino - Urago Mella - Oberdan - Venezia - Piave - Duca Abruzzi - Giorgione - Sanpolino

References

External links

Brescia Metro stations
Railway stations opened in 2013
2013 establishments in Italy
Railway stations in Italy opened in the 21st century